Patriarch Joasaph of Constantinople may refer to:

 Joasaph I of Constantinople, Ecumenical Patriarch in the 1460s
 Joasaph II of Constantinople, "the Magnificent", Ecumenical Patriarch in 1556–1565